Fairview, Pennsylvania may refer to:

 Fairview, Butler County, Pennsylvania, a borough
 Fairview, Erie County, Pennsylvania, a census-designated place
 Fairview, Franklin County, Pennsylvania, an unincorporated community
 Fairview, Mercer County, Pennsylvania

See also
 West Fairview, Pennsylvania
 Fairview Township, Pennsylvania (disambiguation)
 Fairview (disambiguation)